The Private Practice of Michael Shayne is a 1940 detective novel by the American writer Brett Halliday. It was the second book in Halliday's Michael Shayne series of novels, after Dividend on Death (1939).

Film adaptation
In the same year as its release, the novel was adapted into a film Michael Shayne, Private Detective starring Lloyd Nolan as the private detective hero. It started a film series made by Twentieth Century Fox featuring Nolan.

References

Bibliography
 Backer, Ron. Mystery Movie Series of 1940s Hollywood. McFarland, 2010.

1940 American novels
Novels by Brett Halliday
American novels adapted into films